Gísli Pálsson is a Icelandic Anthropologist, born in 1949 in Vestmannaeyjar, Iceland. He was a professor of anthropology at the University of Iceland until his retirement in 2019. He is currently holding the Professor Emeritus title in the anthropology Department at the university of Iceland. Gísli has published works in the fields of Social Anthropology, Environmental Anthropology and Molecular Anthropology.

Gísli's main focus in anthropology has been involving Ethnography, and more specifically, in the field of Genomic Anthropology.

Contributions

Genomic anthropology 
Gísli is an anthropologist who focuses specifically on Genomic Anthropology. Genomic Anthropology is also referred to as Molecular Anthropology. According to Gísli, Genomic Anthropology is used "to denote a hybrid field that increasingly involves anthropologists in the fusion of the “social” and the “biological” in the wake of genomic studies." Genomic Anthropology is used in Anthropology as a way to expand the knowledge of the variations of Human genomes. Genomic Anthropology for anthropologists can be used to explain human variation and has been used in DNA profiling in forensics. Gísli work relating to Genomic Anthropology has been focusing on Inuit populations in Nunavut and Greenland, as well as Icelandic populations.

Academics 
Gísli was a professor of anthropology at the University of Iceland.  He celebrated his retirement in 2019. His main field of focus in Anthropology was environmental and social anthropology. He is the author, editor, or co-editor of several books, including a biography of one of the first people of colour to live in Iceland, Hans Jonatan.

Awards and fellowships 
Gísli has been awarded a fellowship for the Royal Anthropological Institute of Great Britain and Ireland. He is also a Fellow of the European Association of Social Anthropology.

Gísli was awarded the Rosenstiel Award in Oceanographic Science at the Rosenstiel School of Marine and Atmospheric Science, University of Miami in 2000. He has been awarded the Vinson Sutlive Book Prize in Historical Anthropology which had been awarded to him by the College of William and Mary in 2018. He is a member (fellow) of the Royal Anthropological Institute of Great Britain and Ireland. He is also a member of the European Association of Social Anthropology. He has been awarded the Vinson Sutlive Book Prize in Historical Anthropology which had been awarded to him by the College of William and Mary in 2018. He was a Scientific committee member for the European Association of Social Anthropologists for the 10th EASA Biennial Conference: Ljubljana, Slovenia in 2008.

See also 

 Tim Ingold

Further reading 

 Writing on Ice: The Ethnographic Notebooks of V. Stefansson (2001)
 The Textual Life of Savants: Ethnography, Iceland, and the Linguistic Turn (1995)
 Nature and Society: Anthropological Perspectives.
 Social and Cultural Anthropology Key Concepts (2014)
 Making Anthropology, Archaeology, Art and Architecture (2013)
 Beyond Boundaries: Understanding, Translation, and Anthropological Discourse (1994).
 Enskilment of the sea (1994)
 Reconceptiualizing the 'Anthrops' in the Anthropocene: Intergrating the Social sciences and Humanities in Global environmental change research (2013)

References

External links
 Palsson - The University of Manitoba Press

1949 births
Living people
Gisli Palsson
Ethnographers
Fellows of the Royal Anthropological Institute of Great Britain and Ireland
Gisli Palsson